María Laura Leguizamón (born 21 January 1965) is an Argentine Justicialist Party politician. She was a National Senator for Buenos Aires Province from 2011 to 2017 and for the City of Buenos Aires from 2003 to 2007. She also served in the Argentine Chamber of Deputies and in the Buenos Aires City Legislature.

Leguizamón was born in La Plata and graduated as a lawyer and notary from the University of La Plata. She worked as an official for the government of Buenos Aires Province.

In 1993 Leguizamón was elected to the Argentine Chamber of Deputies, serving until 1997. In 2000 she became a legislator in the city of Buenos Aires and in 2003 she became the youngest senator. She was appointed to replace the deceased Socialist senator Alfredo Bravo amid some controversy, since normally the former senator's party is allowed to nominate a replacement, but Bravo's electoral coalition had subsequently collapsed.

Leguizamón sat in the Front for Victory block of President Néstor Kirchner and her term ended in 2007. She had been expected to stand again for the Senate, but was instead placed tenth on the Front for Victory's list for Deputies in Buenos Aires Province. She returned to the Chamber of Deputies in December 2007.

Leguizamón's brother, Aníbal Leguizamón, also became a Deputy in 2007, opposed to the FPV bloc.

References

External links
Senate profile

1965 births
Living people
People from La Plata
Argentine people of Basque descent
Justicialist Party politicians
Members of the Argentine Senate for Buenos Aires
Members of the Argentine Senate for Buenos Aires Province
Members of the Argentine Chamber of Deputies elected in Buenos Aires Province
Women members of the Argentine Senate
Women members of the Argentine Chamber of Deputies
Members of the Buenos Aires City Legislature